Archduke Karl Ferdinand of Austria (Vienna, 29 July 1818 – Gross Seelowitz (Židlochovice Castle), 20 November 1874) was the second son of Archduke Charles, Duke of Teschen (1771–1847) and Princess Henrietta of Nassau-Weilburg, and the maternal grandfather of King Alfonso XIII of Spain.

A son of the "hero of Aspern", he started his military career in Infantry Regiment 57 in Brno. Later, he received command of a brigade in Italy and fought against the insurgents in Prague in 1848.
In 1859, he was a general in Moravia and Silesia and returned to Brno in 1860. He became a lieutenant field marshal of the Austrian Army.

Marriage and children 
In Vienna, on 18 April 1854, Karl Ferdinand married his first cousin, Archduchess Elisabeth of Austria (1831–1903), the widow of Archduke Ferdinand of Austria-Este, the daughter of Archduke Joseph of Austria, Palatine of Hungary and the mother of Queen Maria Theresia of Bavaria .

They had six children:

 Archduke Franz Joseph of Austria (1855)
 Archduke Friedrich of Austria, Duke of Teschen (1856–1936), Supreme Commander of the Austro-Hungarian Army during World War I.
 Archduchess Maria Christina of Austria (1858–1929), married King Alfonso XII of Spain
 Archduke Charles Stephen of Austria (1860–1933), Admiral
 Archduke Eugen of Austria (1863–1954), Fieldmarshal
 Archduchess Maria Eleonora of Austria (1864)

Ancestry

1818 births
1874 deaths
House of Habsburg-Lorraine
Austrian princes
Austro-Hungarian Army officers
Austrian lieutenant field marshals
Knights of the Golden Fleece of Austria
Burials at the Imperial Crypt